Manafwa District is a district in the Eastern Region of Uganda. Manafwa is the district headquarters.

Location
Manafwa District is bordered by Bududa District to the north, Kenya to the east and south, Tororo District to the south-west, and Mbale District to the west.

Overview
Manafwa District was created in 2005 and was part of Mbale District, together with Sironko District, before that. In 2006, the northern part of Manafwa District was carved off to form Bududa District. It is made up of 1 county and 18 rural sub-counties, 4 town councils, 3 traditional divisions that is Buwagogo, Bugobero and Butiru, 81 parishes and 862 villages.

Population
In 1991, the national population census estimated the district population at 178,500. The national census of 2002 estimated the population at 262,600 inhabitants. In 2012, the population was estimated at 367,500.

See also
Bamasaba
Bugisu sub-region

References

External links
Map of Manafwa District At Google Maps

 
Districts of Uganda
Bugisu sub-region
Eastern Region, Uganda